Dumitru Gheorghe (born 26 October 1936) is a Romanian wrestler. He competed at the 1956 Summer Olympics and the 1960 Summer Olympics.

References

External links
 

1936 births
Living people
Romanian male sport wrestlers
Olympic wrestlers of Romania
Wrestlers at the 1956 Summer Olympics
Wrestlers at the 1960 Summer Olympics
Sportspeople from Bucharest